Petr Zámorský (born August 3, 1992) is a Czech professional ice hockey defenceman who is currently playing with Kometa Brno of the Czech Extraliga (ELH).

Playing career
Undrafted, Zámorský played as a youth with PSG Zlín of the Czech Extraliga. In his third professional season in 2013–14 with Championship winning Zlin, he was selected as the Czech Extraliga's Best Defenseman. On May 5, 2014, he initially signed a two-year contract as a free agent with Espoo Blues of the Finnish Liiga.

After appearing in his first senior international tournament at the 2014 World Championships in which he finished second amongst Czech defenseman in scoring,  Zámorský caught NHL attention and used his NHL 'out clause' with the Blues to sign a two-year entry-level contract with the New York Rangers on June 11, 2014. Zámorský was returned to the Blues on loan for the first year of his contract in the 2014–15 season.

In his first North American season in 2015–16, Zámorský attended the Rangers training camp and on September 23, 2015, was assigned to their American Hockey League affiliate, the Hartford Wolf Pack to begin the year. He contributed with a goal and assist in 10 games, before he opted for a return to Europe and was placed on unconditional waivers, terminating his contract with the New York Rangers on November 17, 2015. On November 23, 2015, he returned to Örebro HK of the SHL on a two-year deal.

Career statistics

Regular season and playoffs

International

References

External links

1992 births
Living people
Czech ice hockey defencemen
Espoo Blues players
Hartford Wolf Pack players
Stadion Hradec Králové players
Örebro HK players
HC Sparta Praha players
PSG Berani Zlín players
Sportspeople from Zlín
Czech expatriate ice hockey players in Finland
Czech expatriate ice hockey players in Sweden
Czech expatriate ice hockey players in the United States